Cut and paste is a method for digital transfer of text or other data in computing

Cut and paste may also refer to:
 Cut & Paste, a 1984 word processor from Electronic Arts
 Cut and Paste (film), a 2006 Egyptian film

See also
 Copy and paste (disambiguation)